The Philippines national beach soccer team represents the Philippines in international beach soccer competitions and is controlled by the Beach Football Association of the Philippines, an affiliate member of the Philippines Football Federation, the governing body for football in the Philippines. The national team is sponsored by Columbia Sportswear and Everlast. The made its first international debut at the 2006 AFC Beach Soccer Championship.

Current squad
Current as of October 2014.

Head coach: Athab Ahmed Ayada

Fixtures and results

Tournament records

Asian Championship

AFF Championship

Current staff
 Head coach:   Mike Athab (2006-)

References

Asian national beach soccer teams
Beach soccer
Beach soccer in the Philippines